Shujeo Shyam (born 1946) is a Bangladeshi singer, composer, and music director. He won Bangladesh National Film Award for Best Music Director four times for the films Hason Raja (2002), Joyjatra (2004), Obujh Bou (2010) and Joiboti Konyar Mon (2021). He was awarded Ekushey Padak in 2018 by the Government of Bangladesh.

Early life and career
Shyam was involved with Swadhin Bangla Betar Kendra since April 1971.

discography

Awards
Shilpakala Padak (2015)
Bangladesh National Film Award for Best Music Director
2002 for Hason Raja
2004 for Joyjatra
2010 for Abujh Bou
2021 for Joiboti Konyar Mon
Ekushey Padak (2018)

References

External links
 

Living people
1946 births
Bangladeshi composers
Best Music Director National Film Award (Bangladesh) winners
Recipients of the Ekushey Padak